Self Defense Family (shortened to Self Defense and previously known as End of a Year) are an American rock band with members from across the United States and England. The band has released six full-length albums and several EPs and splits. Their sixth and latest studio album Have You Considered Punk Music was released June 29, 2018, on Run For Cover Records.

History
End of a Year started as a side project for a number of musicians based in Albany, New York already involved in full-time bands. Having spent time in heavier bands, the initial End of a Year line-up was interested in trying something more overtly melodic. Taking their name from an Embrace song, the band's original sound was highly influenced by the Revolution Summer-era DC bands.

The band recorded a boombox demo to give out at their first show, which took place at SUNY Albany. Shortly thereafter, a more formal demo entitled "Warm" was recorded. A full-length, Disappear Here, appeared on local labels Oneohfive and Losingface Records. The band later released a split 7-inch with western Massachusetts band Three Fifteen on another local label, Slave Union. It was this record that caught the attention of Revelation Records, and the band made the jump in 2006, recording their first full-length for the California label in the spring of that year.

Sincerely was recorded with Don Zientara at Inner Ear Studio, adding to the perception that the band was striving for a DC-centered sound; the actual music, however, strayed further from that model than on previous releases.

In the spring of 2009 the band released an EP for Deathwish Inc. and announced plans for a full-length release for the label. In 2010, Deathwish Inc released the band's third full-length album entitled You Are Beneath Me.

The band regularly names songs after actual people with lyrical content that, though oblique, seems to reference the person. Some people the band has given song titles to include:

Audrey Kishline, former proponent of Moderation Management
Micheal Ray Richardson, former NBA basketball player and current coach of the Lawton-Fort Sill Cavalry
Michael Larson, notable for his record-breaking winnings on the American game show Press Your Luck
William Kennedy, author and Albany, New York-area resident
Charles Rocket, late comedian and actor
Marissa Wendolovske, contemporary artist
Eddie Antar, one time proprietor of Crazy Eddie Electronics
 Phillip Jose Farmer, American sci-fi/fantasy author
Emanuela Orlandi, teenage girl whose Vatican City disappearance remains unsolved
Dave Sim, Canadian cartoonist and publisher

In late 2010, the band announced that they would be "reformatting" the group to officially include all touring and session musicians they had worked with up to that point as well as changing the group's name to Self Defense Family. To go along with this announcement, they posted four songs from the You Are Beneath Me LP with Patrick Kindlon's lead vocal track removed and replaced by vocals from Caroline Corrigan, including one song that was also reworked into an acoustic version. The band's tours have since been done on the basis of whoever is available at the time, with the same attitude being taken towards picking line-ups for their studio output. This format was taken to its furthest extent early on when one line-up of the band played a gig in Connecticut while another line-up traveled to Jamaica to record music for the first 7-inch in their Island Series of singles. As such, no member of Self Defense Family has played every show or played on every recording.

Band name
The group formed in 2003 under the name "End of a Year" derived from an Embrace song of the same name. After the release of their 2010 album You Are Beneath Me, the group wanted to change their name to "Self Defense". As an interim name to ease the transition between names, Self Defense went by the name "End Of A Year Self Defense Family", and occasionally "Self Defense Music". Vocalist Patrick Kindlon likened the transition to Will Oldham's name changes. According to Kindlon, Oldham's band name went from "Palace Brothers to Palace Songs to Palace Music to Bonnie Prince Billy to Will Oldham." On various vinyl releases, Self Defense used several "also known as" monikers including: Barf Spectrum, Meredith Hunter, Comforter, Pewter Wizards, and Weird Field.

Discography
The band is known for its prodigious output, often releasing a full-length album and several short efforts in a single year, normally through several different labels. Among them includes 4–5 songs EP sometimes with specific themes, like the relationship focused Duets  and "Superior" which is centred on the movement to make the Upper Peninsula the 51st state. They also have an ongoing series of 7-inch singles recorded on Islands like Jamaica and Iceland, and have put out splits and collaborative EPs with a wide variety of bands including post-hardcore band Touché Amoré, post-punk band Creative Adult, hardcore punk band Axis, and even themselves under the pseudonym Meredith Hunter.  They have likened these shorter outputs to "one night stands".

Studio albums

Singles and EPs

Splits

Compilation albums

Live albums

Videos
 The Things You Like / I'm Going Through Some Shit (Split Music Video with Aficionado) (2011)
Tithe Pig (2014)
 Talia (2015)
 Dave Sim (2015)
 The Supremacy of Pure Artistic Feeling (2018)
 Have You Considered Punk Music (2018)

References

External links
End of a Year Self Defense Family Youtube Channel

American post-hardcore musical groups
American post-punk music groups
Deathwish Inc. artists
Run for Cover Records artists